James Fowler (born 26 October 1980) is a Scottish professional football coach and former player.

As a player, Fowler spent fourteen years of his career with Kilmarnock, making over 400 league appearances, and represented Scotland internationally at under-21 and B levels.

Towards the end of his playing career, Fowler signed with Queen of the South as a player/coach. He was soon afterwards appointed team manager, and held this position until April 2016. He then assisted Jack Ross at St Mirren and Sunderland, before returning to Kilmarnock in November 2019.

Playing career

Club
Fowler graduated from the Kilmarnock youth setup. He played in a variety of different positions for Kilmarnock, with the longest continual spell being spent at right back. On 18 March 2012, he played in the 2012 Scottish League Cup Final, which Kilmarnock won 1–0 against Celtic. Fowler was granted a testimonial by Kilmarnock, which was played against Sheffield Wednesday on 8 August 2012. Fowler holds the record for the most games played in now disbanded Scottish Premier League with 401 appearances.

On 17 January 2014, Fowler moved to Scottish Championship club Cowdenbeath on a one-month loan deal. He was released by Kilmarnock at the end of the 2013–14 season.

International
Fowler was capped twice in 2000 by the Scotland under-21 team. In February 2007, Fowler was rewarded for his development with a late call up to the Scotland B squad against Finland. He played the last 25 minutes in a 2–2 draw at Rugby Park, his club's home ground.

Coaching career
Fowler signed for Queen of the South as first team player-coach on 27 June 2014. He was appointed caretaker manager of the club in September 2014 after Jim McIntyre moved to Ross County and later that month was appointed manager on a permanent basis. On 30 March 2015 he agreed a contract extension until 30 May 2016. Fowler departed Queens on 18 April 2016, two days after a 2–2 draw away to Alloa Athletic and with only two league matches of the 2015–16 season remaining.

On 14 July 2016 Fowler joined Scottish League Two side Stirling Albion as a player-coach, having previously been on trial. He moved to St Mirren in October 2016, becoming assistant manager to Jack Ross. Fowler held this position until May 2018, when he and Ross both moved to Sunderland.

Fowler was appointed "head of football operations" at Kilmarnock in November 2019, giving him responsibility for recruitment and scouting. He became caretaker manager after Alex Dyer left the club in January 2021, and again when Tommy Wright left in December.

In June 2022, Fowler left his role as Head of Football Operations at Kilmarnock due to an internal restructuring.

Managerial statistics

 includes games as a caretaker before permanent appointment.

Honours

Kilmarnock
Scottish League Cup: 2012

In October 2016 he was inducted into the Kilmarnock 'Hall of Fame' alongside other well-known former players such as Tommy McLean, Ray Montgomerie and Stuart McLean.

External links

References

1980 births
Living people
Footballers from Stirling
Scottish footballers
Scotland under-21 international footballers
Scotland B international footballers
Association football defenders
Association football midfielders
Association football utility players
Kilmarnock F.C. players
Cowdenbeath F.C. players
Scottish Premier League players
Scottish Professional Football League players
Queen of the South F.C. players
Scottish football managers
Scottish Professional Football League managers
Queen of the South F.C. managers
St Mirren F.C. non-playing staff
Sunderland A.F.C. non-playing staff
Kilmarnock F.C. non-playing staff
Kilmarnock F.C. managers